Dark Side Romance ( or Goet iik thii tawng mii theu) is a 1995 Thai romantic fantasy film directed by Prachya Pinkaew.

Plot
After a car accident, the spirits of Tan (Tat Na Takuatung and Peang (Kullasatree Siripongpreeda) become trapped in a dangerous limbo, awaiting the chance to be reborn.

Cast
Tat Na Takuatung as Tan
Kullasatree Siripongpreeda as Peang
Chokchai Charoensuk

External links

Dark Side Romance at Siam Zone

1995 films
Thai-language films
1990s romantic fantasy films
Thai romance films
Films directed by Prachya Pinkaew